Serhiy Lebid or Serhii Lebid (born 15 July 1975 in Dnipropetrovsk) is a Ukrainian long-distance runner.

Career
He has won the European Cross Country championships on nine occasions, winning in 1998, 2001, 2002, 2003, 2004, 2005, 2007, 2008 and 2010.

Serhiy Lebid finished seventh in the 5,000 m at the 2000 Olympic Games, but did not qualify from his heat in the same event at the 2004 Olympics.

He won a bronze medal in the 5,000 m final at the 2002 European Athletics Championships in Munich and came fifth in the 10,000 m at the 2006 European Athletics Championships.

Lebid came third at the Great Manchester Run in May 2010. In October he was the best performing European at the Giro al Sas 10K in Trento as he finished third behind Edwin Soi and Wilson Busienei with a time of 28:48.3. He won his record ninth title in the men's race at the 2010 European Cross Country Championships, taking the lead in the final stages after a moderately paced start. This also extended his appearance record at the championships – he is the only athlete to have competed every year since the championships' creation in 1994. He secured a second career win at the Lotto Cross Cup Brussels later that month, holding off the Kenyan challengers. A fourth-place finish at the Great Edinburgh Cross Country in January helped the Europeans to the team title, and he was the first European home at the Cross Internacional de San Sebastián with a third-place finish.

He returned to the Manchester 10K in May 2011 and came third behind Haile Gebrselassie and Chris Thompson.

Serhiy Lebid won the 2014 Nagano Marathon (2:13:56). He took 10th place in the 2015 London Marathon with a time of 2:10:21.

References

External links

Living people
1975 births
Ukrainian male long-distance runners
Ukrainian male cross country runners
Olympic athletes of Ukraine
Athletes (track and field) at the 2000 Summer Olympics
Athletes (track and field) at the 2004 Summer Olympics
Athletes (track and field) at the 2012 Summer Olympics
Sportspeople from Dnipro
European Athletics Championships medalists
World Athletics Championships athletes for Ukraine
Ukrainian male marathon runners
Universiade medalists in athletics (track and field)
European Cross Country Championships winners
Universiade gold medalists for Ukraine
Medalists at the 1999 Summer Universiade
Medalists at the 2001 Summer Universiade
Medalists at the 2003 Summer Universiade